This is a list of southpaw stance boxers. Southpaw is a boxing term that designates the stance where the boxer has his right hand and right foot forward, leading with right jabs, and following with a left cross right hook. Southpaw is the normal stance for a left-handed boxer. The corresponding designation for a right-handed boxer is orthodox, and is generally a mirror-image of the southpaw stance.

References

 
Southpaw
Southpaw boxers